Wees Historic District is a national historic district located at Elkins, Randolph County, West Virginia.  It encompasses 282 contributing buildings, 1 contributing site, and 1 contributing object in a primarily residential section of Elkins. The district includes houses representative of popular architectural styles between about 1890 and 1955.  The district also includes a variety of domestic dependencies, several historic churches, the 7.9-acre City Park, a Works Progress Administration-era public building, and a small number of commercial buildings.  Also in the district is a bronze equestrian statue of Henry Gassaway Davis. Located in the district are the previously listed Davis Memorial Presbyterian Church, Randolph County Courthouse and Jail, and the Warfield-Dye Residence.

It was listed on the National Register of Historic Places in 2006.

References

National Register of Historic Places in Randolph County, West Virginia
Historic districts on the National Register of Historic Places in West Virginia
Buildings and structures in Elkins, West Virginia
Victorian architecture in West Virginia